Visbal is a surname. Notable people with the surname include:

Bryan Visbal (born 1985), Colombian musician, singer, and songwriter
Dann Visbal (born 1989), Colombian musician
Jorge Visbal Martelo (born 1953), Colombian businessman, politician, and convicted criminal
Kristen Visbal (born 1962), American sculptor